Chen Yongqiang (born October 3, 1974, in Shanghai) is a male Chinese sports shooter. He competed in the 2004 Summer Olympics.

In 2004, he finished sixth in the men's 25 metre rapid fire pistol competition.

External links
 profile

1974 births
Living people
ISSF pistol shooters
Olympic shooters of China
Sport shooters from Shanghai
Shooters at the 2004 Summer Olympics
Asian Games medalists in shooting
Shooters at the 2002 Asian Games
Chinese male sport shooters
Asian Games gold medalists for China
Asian Games bronze medalists for China
Medalists at the 2002 Asian Games
21st-century Chinese people